Lagria hirta is a species of beetles in the family Tenebrionidae.

Etymology
The species name hirta comes from the Latin hirtus meaning rough hair or rough wool, referring to the coarse, fuzzy appearance of the beetle.

Distribution
This species is present in Europe, in North Africa (Algeria, Morocco), in Russia (Western and Eastern Siberia), in Israel, Turkey, Iran, Iraq, Kazakhstan, Turkmenistan, Uzbekistan and Tajikistan.

Habitat
It prefers areas with sandy soils. It can be found in open woods, in deciduous forests, in forest clearings, forest edges, in grasslands and wet meadows, but also in dry valleys and wet areas.

Description

These beetles have a soft and elongated body and a head and thorax brown or shiny black. The relatively elongated elytra are yellowish-brown and covered by dense fine light yellowish-brown hairs. The rest of the body is also hairy, but they are less clearly visible. Antennae, underside of body and legs are black. The eyes are remarkably large and round. Antennae are composed with eleven segments.

The elytra of the females are more extended backward than in the males and the female's abdomen looks from above wider than in the males. The male, in addition to its slimmer body, is distinguished from the females by their larger eyes and by the length of the last segment of the antennae, which is nearly twice the corresponding segment in the female. The hind wings are transparent.

Biology
The fully formed beetles can be seen from late May to September. The adult beetles feed on nectar and pollen. Females lay the eggs in the soil  where they hatch after about eight days. The larvae live in the humus where they feed on decaying vegetables. After having overwintered larvae pupate in early summer of the next year and a new generation of beetles will then developed.

Bibliography
 Michael Chinery, Insectes de France et d'Europe occidentale, Paris, Flammarion, 2012, 320 p., p. 276
 Vladimir Novák: Beetles of the family Tenebrionidae of Central Europe. Praga: Academia, 2014, s. 203–235, Zoological Keys

References

External links

L. hirta on Zin.ru
Aliquò, M., Rastelli, M., Rastelli, S., Soldati, F. "Coleotteri Tenebrionidi d'Italia - Darkling Beetles of Italy"
 INPN

Lagriinae
Beetles of Asia
Beetles of Europe
Beetles of North Africa
Beetles described in 1758
Taxa named by Carl Linnaeus